The Austrian Football Second League is the second-highest professional division in Austrian football. It was formerly called the First League (Erste Liga), from 2002 to 2018.

The division currently contains 16 teams, and the champion of the league is promoted to the Austrian Bundesliga. The three last placed teams are directly relegated from the Second League into the regional leagues.
The Austrian Football Second Bundesliga is currently known as HPYBET 2. liga for sponsorship reasons.

Teams and stadia for the 2021–22 season

Starting in the 2018–19 season, the former First League changed its name to the Second League and expanded from ten teams to 16 teams.

The 16 teams competing in the 2020–21 Second League season are:

Teams
Sixteen teams will participate in the 2021–22 season. The only added team is St. Pölten, relegated from the 2020–21 Austrian Football Bundesliga.

Due to the suspension of the 2020–21 Austrian Regionalliga, no club was relegated from last season

Relegation
The destination of a club relegated from the Second League depends upon which Land (state) of the Federal Republic it is a member. The relegated clubs join one of the Regionalligen (regional leagues) in the east, centre or west of the country. The three regional league champions are promoted to the Second League. Participation in the professional Second League is conditional on their licensing by the fifth senate of the federal league. If the licence is refused for economic reasons, one team fewer will be relegated.

Past winners

 1974–75: Grazer AK
 1975–76: First Vienna FC
 1976–77: Wiener Sport-Club
 1977–78: SV Austria Salzburg
 1978–79: Linzer ASK
 1979–80: SC Eisenstadt
 1980–81: FC Wacker Innsbruck
 1981–82: Austria Klagenfurt
 1982–83: SV Sankt Veit
 1983–84: SV Spittal/Drau
 1984–85: Salzburger AK 1914
 1985–86: Wiener Sport-Club
 1986–87: SV Austria Salzburg
 1987–88: Kremser SC
 1988–89: Kremser SC
 1989–90: SV Spittal/Drau
 1990–91: VfB Mödling
 1991–92: Linzer ASK
 1992–93: Grazer AK
 1993–94: Linzer ASK
 1994–95: Grazer AK
 1995–96: FC Linz
 1996–97: SC Austria Lustenau
 1997–98: SK Vorwärts Steyr
 1998–99: Schwarz-Weiß Bregenz
 1999–00: VfB Admira Wacker Mödling
 2000–01: FC Kärnten
 2001–02: ASKÖ Pasching
 2002–03: SV Mattersburg
 2003–04: FC Wacker Tirol
 2004–05: SV Ried
 2005–06: SC Rheindorf Altach
 2006–07: LASK Linz
 2007–08: Kapfenberger SV
 2008–09: SC Wiener Neustadt
 2009–10: FC Wacker Innsbruck
 2010–11: FC Admira Wacker Mödling
 2011–12: Wolfsberger AC
 2012–13: SV Grödig
 2013–14: SC Rheindorf Altach
 2014–15: SV Mattersburg
 2015–16: SKN St. Pölten
 2016–17: LASK Linz
 2017–18: FC Wacker Innsbruck
 2018–19: WSG Swarovski Tirol
 2019–20: SV Ried
 2020–21: FC Blau-Weiß Linz
 2021–22: SC Austria Lustenau

Champions

Name history
The Austrian second division has had several different names and sponsors since 1974.

(Seasons below represent the first season when the name was used)

 1974/75 Nationalliga
 1975/76 2. Division
 1993/94 2. Division der Bundesliga
 1998/99 Erste Division
 2002/03 Red Zac-Erste Liga
 2008/09 ADEG Erste Liga
 2010/11 „Heute für Morgen“ Erste Liga
 2014/15 Sky Go Erste Liga
 2018/19 2. Liga

The league was known as the Sky Go Erste Liga for sponsorship reasons from 2014/15 to 2017/18, but Sky is not mentioned on the official website 2liga.at, or in the ÖFB's 2018/19 preview articles.

References

External links
  
 Bundesliga.at 
  League321.com - Austrian football league tables, records & statistics database. 

 
2
Second level football leagues in Europe
Sports leagues established in 1974
1974 establishments in Austria
Professional sports leagues in Austria